Harrison is a former community in the town of Harrison, Calumet County, Wisconsin, United States.

History
Harrison was settled in the 1870s around a Catholic church and school between Stockbridge and Sherwood. The church's first priest was Rev. John Adt. The original community has been a ghost town since before the 1970s and the only remnant of that community is the church's cemetery.

Notes

Geography of Calumet County, Wisconsin
Ghost towns in Wisconsin